Tom Campana (born January 18, 1950) is a former award-winning and all-star slotback who played in the Canadian Football League from 1972 to 1977 with the Saskatchewan Roughriders.

A native of Kent, Ohio, and a graduate of his home state Ohio State University, Camapana was part of the Buckeyes' 1970 national championship team. Joining the Green Riders in 1972, he was a CFL Western All-Star and runner-up for rookie of the year (to Chuck Ealey for the CFL's Most Outstanding Rookie Award). He also played in the 64th Grey Cup when the Green Riders lost in the last minute. He finished his career in 1977 having caught 269 passes for 4040 yards, rushed for 554 yards, and scored 30 touchdowns.

References

1950 births
Living people
Canadian Football League Rookie of the Year Award winners
Ohio State Buckeyes football players
Sportspeople from Kent, Ohio
Saskatchewan Roughriders players